The Steuart Blakemore Building, originally built in 1900 and used as the Lancaster Post Office until 1931, is a museum and historical archive, part of the Mary Ball Washington Museum and Library in Lancaster, Virginia.

It forms a part of a five building complex, located in the Lancaster Court House Historic District, which also includes the Old Jail (1820), Clerk's Office (c. 1797), and Lancaster House.

The Museum is open to the public, who may view exhibits, participate in educational programs and trace family histories. It seeks to recapture the stories and the rich history of the people of the Northern Neck of the Chesapeake Bay, Virginia.

The building has in recent years been used both as storage for the Museum collections and also as the office for the Lancaster County History Book Committee.

History
The building was constructed by an attorney, Harvey Gresham, in around 1900. Gresham ran his legal practice from the back of the building and the post office from the front. Until that time there had been no official post office in Lancaster, though postal stops were made to local taverns or stores.

After construction of a new Post Office during the 1950s, it became known as "The Old Post Office".

In 1983 it was designated a National Historic Landmark, as part of the Lancaster Court House Historic District.

The building was donated to the museum in 1986 by George H. Steuart, a native of Lancaster County. Steuart was a Foreign Service Officer who retired as consul in Liverpool, England. He purchased the building in 1981, and named it in honour of his parents, local physician George H Steuart (1865–1945) and Irene Blakemore.

References
 Article in the Rappahannock Record by Charlotte Henry, June 9, 2005
 Deed of Gift dated 29 July 1986 between George H Steuart and the Mary Ball Washington Museum, unpublished.

Notes

External links
Official website of The Mary Ball Washington Museum and Library Retrieved February 21, 2010
Steuart Blakemore Building at www.virginia.org Retrieved February 21, 2010

Museums in Lancaster County, Virginia
History museums in Virginia
Steuart family
Commercial buildings completed in 1901
Historic district contributing properties in Virginia
National Register of Historic Places in Lancaster County, Virginia